Edward McIntosh "Snoozer" Quinn (1907 – April 21, 1949) was a jazz guitarist who was admired by his fellow musicians but who left few recordings.

Career

Quinn was born Edward McIntosh Quinn in McComb, Mississippi, and raised in Bogalusa, Louisiana. At an early age he could play guitar, mandolin, and violin. In his early teens he performed in vaudeville. He graduated from high school in 1924.

He performed with the Paul English Traveling Shows and Peck's Bad Boys led by Peck Kelley, in addition to Claude Blanchard, Mart Britt, the St. Louis Rhythm Kings, and the Louisiana Ramblers.

Quinn was hired by Paul Whiteman in New Orleans after Whiteman heard him playing backstage. He recorded with the Whiteman Orchestra, but he can hardly be heard. While playing for vocalist Bing Crosby in the 1930s, Quinn was given the nickname "Snoozer". Although he did not record with Crosby, he recorded with vocalist Bee Palmer and country singer Jimmie Davis.

Back in New Orleans, Quinn contracted tuberculosis. In 1948, Johnny Wiggs brought a recording machine and a trumpet to the hospital and persuaded him to play. Quinn died six months later. Many years passed before his performances were released by Fat Cat Jazz on his only album, The Legendary Snoozer Quinn.

References

External links
 SnoozerQuinn.com Website dedicated to Snoozer Quinn 
 The Legendary Snoozer Quinn Biography with audio examples of his recordings

1907 births
1949 deaths
Jazz musicians from Mississippi
People from McComb, Mississippi
20th-century American guitarists
20th-century deaths from tuberculosis
20th-century American violinists
American jazz guitarists
American mandolinists
Dixieland banjoists
Dixieland violinists
Guitarists from Louisiana
Tuberculosis deaths in Louisiana